Song of Mexico is a 1945 American musical film written and directed by James A. FitzPatrick and starring Adele Mara, Edgar Barrier, George J. Lewis, Jacqueline Dalya, José Pulido and Raquel De Alva. It was released on December 28, 1945, by Republic Pictures.

Plot

Cast   
Adele Mara as Carol Adams
Edgar Barrier as Gregory Davis
George J. Lewis as Arturo Martinez 
Jacqueline Dalya as Eve Parker
José Pulido as Ramon Carranza
Raquel De Alva as Anita Martinez 
Margaret Falkenberg as Sarah Anderson
Elisabeth Waldo as Elizabeth Waldo-Violinist
Carmen Molina as Specialty Dancer
Tipica Orchestra as Musical Ensemble

References

External links 
 

1945 films
American musical films
1945 musical films
Republic Pictures films
Films directed by James A. FitzPatrick
American black-and-white films
1940s English-language films
1940s American films